Hutias (known in Spanish as jutía) are moderately large cavy-like rodents of the subfamily Capromyinae that inhabit the Caribbean islands, with most species restricted to Cuba and Hispaniola. Twenty species of hutia have been identified, but at least half are extinct. Only Desmarest's hutia and the prehensile-tailed hutia remain common and widespread; all other extant species are considered threatened by the IUCN. The extinct giant hutias of the family Heptaxodontidae also inhabited the Caribbean, but are not thought to be closely related, with the giant hutias belonging in the superfamily Chinchilloidea.

Description 
They resemble the coypu in some respects. Tails are present, varying from vestiges to prehensile. They have stout bodies and large heads. Most species are herbivorous, though some consume small animals. Instead of burrowing underground, they nest in trees or rock crevices.

They are hunted for food in Cuba, where they are often cooked in a large pot with wild nuts and honey. At the Guantanamo Bay Naval Base however, there is an over population due to an abundant food source and the lack of natural predators. Desmarest's hutias are referred to by those stationed at the Guantanamo Bay Naval Base as banana rats.
Banana rats are not named for their dietary preference, but because their feces look like small versions of the fruit. They are known to come out at night.

Phylogeny 
Molecular studies of phylogeny indicate that hutias nest within the Neotropical spiny rats (Echimyidae). Indeed, the hutia subfamily, Capromyinae, is the sister group to Owl's spiny rat Carterodon. In turn, this clade shares phylogenetic affinities with a subfamily of spiny rats, the Euryzygomatomyinae.

Within Capromyidae, the deepest split involves Plagiodontia with respect to other genera, followed by the divergence of Geocapromys. The latter genus is the sister group to a clade in which Capromys branches off before the Mesocapromys and Mysateles split.

Hutias colonized the islands of the Caribbean as far as the Bahamas by island hopping from South America, reaching the Greater Antilles by the early Oligocene. This was facilitated by the direction of prevailing currents.

Systematics 

The systematics of the 10 extant and 11 extinct recognized species of Capromyidae is as follows. Taxa known to be extinct are marked with a dagger (†).
 Subfamily Capromyinae
Tribe Capromyini
 Capromys
Garrido's hutia (Capromys garridoi) (possibly extinct)
 Desmarest's hutia (Capromys pilorides)
 Geocapromys
 Jamaican hutia (Geocapromys brownii)
 Bahamian hutia (Geocapromys ingrahami)
 †Little Swan Island hutia (Geocapromys thoracatus)
 †Cuban coney (Geocapromys columbianus)
†Cayman hutia (Geocapromys caymanensis)
 Mesocapromys
 Cabrera's hutia (Mesocapromys angelcabrerai)
 Eared hutia (Mesocapromys auritus)
 Black-tailed hutia (Mesocapromys melanurus)
 Dwarf hutia (Mesocapromys nana) (possibly extinct)
 San Felipe hutia (Mesocapromys sanfelipensis) (possibly extinct)
 Mysateles
 Prehensile-tailed hutia (Mysateles prehensilis)
Tribe †Hexolobodontini
 †Hexolobodon
 †Imposter hutia (Hexolobodon phenax)
 Tribe Isolobodontini
 †Isolobodon
 †Montane hutia (Isolobodon montanus)
 †Puerto Rican hutia (Isolobodon portoricensis)
 Tribe Plagiodontini
 Plagiodontia
 Hispaniolan hutia (Plagiodontia aedium)
 †Samaná hutia (Plagiodontia ipnaeum)
†Small Haitian hutia (Plagiodonta spelaeum)
 †Hyperplagiodontia
 †Wide-toothed hutia (Hyperplagiodontia araeum)
 †Rhizoplagiodontia
 †Lemke's hutia (Rhizoplagiodontia lemkei)

References

External links 

 The last survivors conservation project

 
Extant Miocene first appearances
Mammal subfamilies